Uruguay has submitted films for the Academy Award for Best International Feature Film regularly since 2001. The award is handed out annually by the United States Academy of Motion Picture Arts and Sciences to a feature-length motion picture produced outside the United States that contains primarily non-English dialogue.

Uruguay, represented by Cinemateca Uruguaya, submitted drama A Place in the World to AMPAS in the fall of 1992. On 3 December 1992, AMPAS included the film on its list of official submissions  and it was screened alongside 32 other films for AMPAS' Foreign Language Film Committee. On 17 February 1993, it was announced that the film had been nominated for an Oscar, representing Uruguay. A controversy quickly began when stories began circulating that the film had minimal Uruguayan artistic input- the film was shot by an Argentine writer/director in Argentina, the plot was set in Argentina, and the cast and crew were primarily from Argentina. The film was in the running (and finished in second place) to represent Argentina in the Oscar race, it represented Argentina at the Golden Globe Awards and eventually went on to win Best Picture at the Argentinian National Film Awards (the Asociación de Críticos Cinematográficos de Argentina)  Ultimately, AMPAS disqualified the film and removed it from the Oscar ballot. Uruguay rejoined the Oscar competition in 2001.

Submissions
The Academy of Motion Picture Arts and Sciences has invited the film industries of various countries to submit their best film for the Academy Award for Best Foreign Language Film since 1956. The Foreign Language Film Award Committee oversees the process and reviews all the submitted films. Following this, they vote via secret ballot to determine the five nominees for the award. Below is a list of the films that have been submitted by Uruguay for review by the Academy for the award by year and the respective Academy Awards ceremony.

All films were produced in Spanish. Their 2005 submission was announced but was not on the official AMPAS list, and did not screen for the Academy. Although most Foreign Film submissions in this category have historically been dramas, Uruguay chose comedies four years in a row, from 2001–2004, and again in 2009-2010.

Five of Uruguay's ten accepted submissions co-starred Uruguayan actor César Troncoso, included those selected from 2007-2009.

Because of the small size of Uruguay's domestic film industry, most of Uruguay's major recent films have been selected for the Oscars. Notable exceptions include 2001's 25 Watts, which lost to In This Tricky Life, Berlin Film Festival
Grand Jury Prize winner Gigante, which lost to Bad Day to Go Fishing in 2009 and Berlinale 2013 Panorama competitor So Much Water, which lost to animated film Anina.

See also
List of Academy Award winners and nominees for Best Foreign Language Film
List of Academy Award-winning foreign language films

Notes

References

External links
The Official Academy Awards Database
The Motion Picture Credits Database
IMDb Academy Awards Page

Best Foreign Language Film Academy Award submissions by country
Academy Award for Best Foreign Language Film
Lists of films by country of production
Academy Award